Park Sung-hee (Hangul: 박성희; born 17 February 1975) is a former tennis player from South Korea.

Career
Park who turned professional in 1989 won seven singles and seven doubles titles on the ITF Women's Circuit. In her career, she reached four doubles finals on the WTA Tour but always ended runner-up. Her best Grand Slam performances came in doubles, reaching the round of 16 at the 1996 French Open, 1997 Australian Open, and the 1998 Australian Open, all partnering with Wang Shi-ting. She reached career-high rankings of No. 34 in doubles (in June 1998) and No. 57 in singles (in September 1995).

Park played in nine years 34 ties for the South Korea Fed Cup team, with a 30–14 record overall and 24–12 in singles, all team records. She retired from the tour in 2000.

WTA career finals

Doubles: 4 (4 runner-ups)

ITF finals

Singles: 13 (7–6)

Doubles: 15 (7–8)

References

External links
 
 
 

1975 births
South Korean female tennis players
Olympic tennis players of South Korea
Tennis players at the 1996 Summer Olympics
Tennis players at the 2000 Summer Olympics
Living people
Asian Games medalists in tennis
Tennis players at the 1994 Asian Games
Tennis players at the 1998 Asian Games
Medalists at the 1994 Asian Games
Medalists at the 1998 Asian Games
Asian Games bronze medalists for South Korea
Asian Games silver medalists for South Korea
Sportspeople from Busan